The Chadian Progressive Party (PPT), known as the National Movement for the Cultural and Social Revolution (MNRCS) for the last two years of its existence, was the first African political party in Chad. It was a regional branch of the African Democratic Rally (RDA).

History
The party was founded in February 1947, by Gabriel Lisette, who had been elected to the French National Assembly in elections the previous November. At first it attracted support mainly from the country's non-Muslim intellectuals; politically it was much more radical and nationalistic than its main rival, the Muslim-dominated Chadian Democratic Union (UDT). This was revealed by its motto: "Enough with cotton! Enough with taxes! Enough with chiefs!" (Plus de coton! Plus d’impôts! Plus de chefs!).

Originally much weaker than the UDT, Lisette lost his seat in the National Assembly in the 1951 elections, in which the two second college seats were both won by the UDT. However, the 1956 electoral reforms expanded the pool of eligible voters and saw power begin to pass to the Christian and Animist south where the PPT had most of its support. In the 1956 French National Assembly elections the PPT received the largest share of the vote in the second college, resulting in Lisette elected back to the National Assembly.

In the Territorial Assembly elections the following year the PPT formed the Entente alliance with the Grouping of Rural and Independent Chadians, the Democratic and Socialist Union of the Resistance, Radicals and Radical Socialists and the Independent Socialist Party of Chad. The Entente won 57 of the 65 seats in the Assembly, with the PPT taking 32. As a result, Lisette became Head of Government. The PPT went on to win the 1959 elections, taking 57 of the 84 seats.

In 1962 a new constitution made Chad a one-party state, with the PPT as the sole legal party. As a result, the party won every seat in the National Assembly in the 1962, 1963 and 1969 parliamentary elections, whilst PPT leader François Tombalbaye was re-elected President unopposed in 1969. Whilst women formed an early part of the political party, by 1968 Kalthouma Nguembang was the only woman in the National Assembly.

In 1973 the party was renamed the "National Movement for the Cultural and Social Revolution" to consolidate support for Tombalbaye–who had changed his name to N'Garta–in the midst of a civil war. However, two years later Tombalbaye was overthrown in a coup and the party was banned in April 1975.

Electoral history

Presidential elections

National Assembly elections

Notes 
Within the Entente, the Chadian Progressive Party won 32 seats, the Grouping of Rural and Independent Chadians won nine, the Democratic and Socialist Union of the Resistance won 7, Radicals and Radical Socialists won 7, the Independent Socialist Party of Chad won 1 in total the alliance won 57 seats

See also 
 Bourkou Louise Kabo 
 Hadjé Halimé

References

1947 establishments in Chad
1975 disestablishments in Chad
African and Black nationalist parties in Africa
African socialist political parties
Anti-imperialist organizations
Defunct political parties in Chad
François Tombalbaye
Parties of one-party systems
Pan-Africanist political parties in Africa
Political parties disestablished in 1975
Political parties established in 1947
Sections of the Rassemblement Démocratique Africain
Socialist parties in Chad